Di Yi, personal name Zǐ Xiàn, was a king of the Shang dynasty of Ancient China from 1101 BC to 1076 BC. His capital was at Yin.

Records 
According to the Bamboo Annals, in the third year of his reign, he ordered Nanzhong to fight Kun Barbarians and built Shuofang (roughly modern Ordos in Inner Mongolia) in the middle of Kun territory after winning a battle. He also fought the Renfang (see the Dongyi), 

The king was the older brother of Jizi and Bigan.

Sons
Weiziqi, Di Yi's eldest son. After the Shang succumbed to the Zhou dynasty, he was awarded the state of Song.
Weizhong, Di Yi's second son, the second ruler of Song.
King Zhou of Shang, Di Yi's youngest son, the last Shang king

Sources 

12th-century BC Chinese monarchs
11th-century BC Chinese monarchs
Shang dynasty kings